Physoptila pinguivora is a moth of the family Gelechiidae. It was described by Edward Meyrick in 1934. It is found on Java in Indonesia.

The larvae bore in the shoots of Planchonia valida.

References

Moths described in 1934
Physoptilinae